The following television stations broadcast on digital or analog channel 42 in Canada:

 CBXT-DT in Edmonton, Alberta 
 CFSK-DT in Saskatoon, Saskatchewan 
 CFTF-DT-1 in Edmundston, New Brunswick 
 CHNB-DT-14 in Charlottetown, Prince Edward Island 
 CITS-DT-1 in Ottawa, Ontario 
 CKCO-TV-3 in Oil Springs-Sarnia, Ontario 
 CKVP-DT in Fonthill, Ontario

References 

42 TV stations in Canada